The Nicaraguan records in swimming are the fastest ever performances of swimmers from Nicaragua, which are recognised and ratified by the Fedaracion de Natacion de Nicaragua (FENANICA).

All records were set in finals unless noted otherwise.

Long Course (50 m)

Men

Women

Mixed relay

Short Course (25 m)

Men

Women

Mixed relay

References
General
Nicaraguan Long Course Records 26 May 2019 updated
Nicaraguan Short Course Records 29 September 2019 updated
Specific

External links
FENANICA official website

Nicaragua
Records
Swimming
Swimming